Amit Bhatia (born 4 September 1979) is a Indian orgin British businessman. He is the founding partner of Swordfish Investments and chairman of Queens Park Rangers football club.

Early and personal life
Amit Bhatia was born in London, United Kingdom. He was educated in Delhi at Columba's School until 1995, followed by Dulwich College in London, United Kingdom, in 1996, and at the British School in Delhi in 1997. Bhatia attended Cornell University where he studied economics. He has since remained involved in alumni matters, now serving on Cornell's External Advisory Council for Internalization. He has lectured at the university's Johnson School for MBA students.

In 2004 Bhatia married Vanisha Mittal, the daughter of steel tycoon and chairman and CEO of ArcelorMittal, Lakshmi Mittal. They have three children.

Career
Bhatia began his career working at Merrill Lynch and Morgan Stanley in New York before moving to Credit Suisse First Boston in London. He then incubated Swordfish Investments, a Mayfair-based private equity/venture fund, and Swordfish Capital Management, an investment management company. Investments included education, media, telecoms, financial services, technology, consumer goods and real estate.

Bhatia was chairman and founder of Hope Construction Materials, the UK's largest independent cement aggregates and concrete company. The company was formed in January 2013 after the divestment of 200 sites by two of the UK's biggest building materials companies, Tarmac Group and Lafarge. Hope's assets include the largest cement works in the UK at Hope Valley in Derbyshire, 172 ready-mix plants, 4 rail heads, 5 major quarries, 7 national offices, a fleet of over 400 tanker and mixer vehicles and over 1000 employees. The company was the UK's first construction firm to join the World Economic Forum's Global Growth Companies (GGC) community and one of just two European construction firms to meet membership criteria.

In August 2016, Bhatia sold Hope to Breedon Aggregates, making the newly formed Breedon Group, the UK's largest independent construction materials group. Bhatia joined the board as a non-executive director following its acquisition and is a substantial shareholder of the company. In April 2018, Bhatia was promoted to become its deputy chairman and in May 2019 Bhatia was appointed as chairman of the board.

His other business interests encompass real estate and technology. Bhatia is a partner of Summix, a strategic land fund with a nationwide portfolio of assets that has delivered thousands of homes across the UK and Ireland since 2006.  In 2017, he helped launch Summix Capital as a vehicle to help deliver larger and more complex projects.

He is also a partner of Initial Capital, an investor in seed and early-stage technology companies with a focus on games and consumer services.  Initial Capital is based out of London and Silicon Valley, and has played a key role in growing its portfolio companies.

Bhatia served on the advisory board of Metro Bank and AirAsia Berhad. He has also served as William Pitt Group group member at Chatham House and a Gold Leaf member of the Aspen Institute. He was awarded Young Entrepreneur of the Year by Theresa May in 2013, Outstanding Young Executive of the Year and Young Director of the Year in 2014.

Sports
In 2007 Bhatia bought a stake in Queens Park Rangers FC. He has served as their vice-chairman since then with the exception of a brief time in 2011, when he resigned from QPR's board in frustration after his bid to buy the whole club was unsuccessful.

On 15 August 2018, Bhatia was appointed chairman of the club after co-chairmen Tony Fernandes and Ruben Gnanalingam vacated their positions.

References

English football chairmen and investors
British people of Indian descent
Queens Park Rangers F.C. directors and chairmen
Samuel Curtis Johnson Graduate School of Management alumni
1979 births
Living people
British philanthropists
St. Columba's School, Delhi alumni
People educated at Dulwich College